Sharrock or Sharrocks is an English language surname. It may refer to:

 Chris Sharrock (born 1964), British musician
 Burgess Sharrocks (1919–1988), British artist
 George Sharrock (1910–2005), American politician
 Ivan Sharrock (born 1941), British sound engineer
 John Sharrock (born 1944), Australian football player
 Linda Sharrock (born 1947), American singer
 Robert Sharrock (1630–1684), British clergyman and botanist
 Sonny Sharrock (1940–1994), American musician
 Thea Sharrock (born 1976), British theatre director
 Wayne Sharrocks (born 1965), British writer
 William Sharrock (1742–1809), British bishop

Television
 "Sharrock (Space Ghost Coast to Coast)", an episode of Space Ghost Coast to Coast

See also
 Shorrock

English-language surnames